Bilka-Kaufhaus GmbH v Weber von Hartz (1986) C-170/84 is an EU labour law case, that sets out the test for objective justification for indirect discrimination.

Facts
Karin Weber von Hartz was a part-time worker, who had worked for 15 years at Bilka-Kaufhaus. She was refused pension payments under her contract with her employer Bilka-Kaufhaus, which required her to have worked full time for 15 years. She had a German state pension, on top, however. She claimed this was sex discrimination under the Treaty establishing the European Economic Community (TEEC) article 119 (now TFEU art 157). She alleged that women work more part-time, so they are at a disadvantage. Bilka-Kaufhaus argued it was justified in excluding part-time workers because there are higher administrative costs for giving pensions to part-time workers, given the work they do. They also said 81.3 per cent of all occupational pensions were paid to women, even though only 72% of employees were women, so the scheme was unrelated to sex discrimination.

Weber started proceedings are a German Labour Court. The decision was appealed to the Federal Labour Court, which decided to stay proceedings and ask for a preliminary ruling to the European Court of Justice (ECJ).

Judgment
The ECJ considered first whether pension payments were pay and held they were. They then asked whether there was potentially indirect discrimination, held that there could be, but that it was up to the member state court to determine the facts. There could be objective justification if the employer showed the disparate treatment was based on a "real need" of the business. It said the following.

See also

EU law
UK labour law

Notes

References

1986 in the European Economic Community
Court of Justice of the European Union case law
1986 in case law
1986 in Germany
German case law
European Union labour law
European Union labour case law